Twelve Point Buck is the fourth album by Killdozer, released in 1989 through Touch and Go Records. After listening to this album, Nirvana's leader Kurt Cobain chose to work with producer Butch Vig for his band's next work, the multiplatinum Nevermind.

Track listing

Personnel
Killdozer
Michael Gerald – vocals, bass guitar, baritone horn
Bill Hobson – guitar
Dan Hobson – drums
Production and additional personnel
Frank l Anderson – accordion on "Free Love in Amsterdam"
Bill Crawford – trumpet on "Lupus"
Eric Olson – trumpet on "Lupus"
Steve Marker – production, engineering
Butch Vig – production

Charts

References

External links 
 

1988 albums
Killdozer (band) albums
Touch and Go Records albums
Albums produced by Butch Vig